Keharwa or Kaharva is a tala of Hindustani music. Keherwa has many variations including dhumaali, "bhajani", and qawwali.
Beats = 8 
Division = 2

Arrangement
Keharwa is an 8-beat pattern used in ragas. It has eight beats in two equal divisions (vibhag). The period between every two beats is equal. The first beat out of 8 beats is called "saam" and it denotes the start of the first division. The fifth beat out of 8 beats is called "khali" and denotes the start of the second division. To exhibit the Keherwa, the performer claps on the first beat and fifth beat is waved.

Theka

It has a characteristic pattern of bols (theka).

In popular culture
The popular Hindi film song, Rang Barse Bhige Chunar Wali from Silsila (1981), is also set in Keherwa by film's music composers duo, Shiv-Hari, who are noted classical musicians. The contemporary traditional Eid al-Fitr song for Bengali Muslims, O Mon Romzaner Oi Rozar Sheshe, is also set in Keherwa rhythm.

References

Hindustani talas